The 2014 Nürnberger Versicherungscup was a professional tennis tournament played on clay courts. It was the second edition of the tournament, and part of the 2014 WTA Tour. It took place in Nuremberg, Germany, on 18–24 May 2014.

Points and prize money

Point distribution

Prize money

Singles main draw entrants

Seeds 

 1 Rankings as of 12 May 2014

Other entrants 
The following players received wildcards into the singles main draw:
  Anna-Lena Friedsam
  Antonia Lottner
  Lisa-Maria Moser

The following players received entry from the qualifying draw:
  Beatriz García Vidagany
  Julia Glushko
  Anastasia Rodionova
  Nina Zander

The following players received entry into the singles main draw as lucky losers:
  Montserrat González
  Tereza Martincová

Withdrawals 
Before the tournament
  Lourdes Domínguez Lino → replaced by  Mona Barthel
  Garbiñe Muguruza → replaced by  Belinda Bencic
  Anna Karolína Schmiedlová (right shoulder injury) → replaced by  Tereza Martincová
  Roberta Vinci → replaced by  Montserrat González

Doubles main draw entrants

Seeds 

1 Rankings as of 12 May 2014

Other entrants 
The following pair received a wildcard into the doubles main draw:
  Yvonne Meusburger /  Kathinka von Deichmann

Champions

Singles 

  Eugenie Bouchard def.  Karolína Plíšková 6–2, 4–6, 6–3

Doubles 

  Michaëlla Krajicek /  Karolína Plíšková def.  Raluca Olaru /  Shahar Pe'er 6–0, 4–6, [10–6]

External links 

 

2014 WTA Tour
2014
2014 in German tennis